James Lindsay may refer to:

In the British peerage:
James Lindsay of Crawford (died 1358) (died 1358), Scottish nobleman 
James Lindsay of Crawford (died 1395/6) (died 1395/6), Scottish nobleman
James Lindsay, 5th Earl of Balcarres (1691–1768), Scottish peer
James Lindsay, 24th Earl of Crawford (1783–1869), Scottish peer

In politics:
James Alexander Lindsay (1815–1874), British Conservative Member of Parliament for Wigan
James Lindsay, 26th Earl of Crawford (1847–1913), Victorian astronomer and politician
James Lindsay (Conservative politician) (1906–1997), British Conservative Member of Parliament
James Lindsay, 3rd Baron Lindsay of Birker (born 1945), retired Australian diplomat

In religion:
James Lindsay (theologian) (1852–1923), Scottish minister, theologian and author
James Gordon Lindsay (1906–1973), revivalist preacher, author, and founder of Christ for the Nations

In sport:
Jamie Lindsay (footballer, born 1870) (born c. 1870), Scottish footballer
James Lindsay (footballer) (1891–?), Scottish footballer
Jamie Lindsay (footballer, born 1995), Scottish footballer (Celtic FC, Dumbarton FC, Ross County FC, currently Rotherham United FC)

In other fields:
James Bowman Lindsay (1799–1862), Scottish inventor and author noted for his invention of the electric light bulb
James Lindsay (actor) (1869–1928), British actor
James J. Lindsay (born 1932), U.S. Army general
James M. Lindsay (born 1959), American academic and foreign policy specialist
James A. Lindsay (born 1979), American mathematician, author, and cultural critic.

See also
Jimmy Lindsay (disambiguation)
James Lindesay-Bethune, 16th Earl of Lindsay (born 1955), Scottish nobleman